Naesiotus bambamarcaensis is a species of tropical air-breathing land snail, a pulmonate gastropod mollusk in the family Bulimulidae.

Distribution 

 Peru

The type locality is Cerro Machaipungo near Bambamarca. Breure (2010) have published another locality Chalamarca 06°29’29’S 078°28’07’W, Cajamarca Region, Peru, that is about 20 km SSW from the type locality.

Description 
The specimens from the Chalamarca locality are slightly smaller than the holotype and vary in their dimensions, but otherwise show the colour pattern characteristic for this species, viz. corneous-brown with a whitish spiral band at the periphery of the last whorl.

References
This article incorporates CC-BY-3.0 text from the reference 

 Ramírez R., Paredes C., Arenas J. (2003). Moluscos del Perú. Revista de Biologia Tropical. 51(supplement 3): 225-284

Bulimulidae
Gastropods described in 1960